Pär Håkan Gerell (born 23 June 1982 in Växjö) is a Swedish table tennis player. He has been playing for French club Chartres ASTT since 2010. Based on his June 2011 world ranking, Gerell qualified for the London 2012 Olympic Games.  He also competed at the 2008 Summer Olympics.

Clubs
 until 2005: Falkenbergs BTK
 2005–10: TTF Liebherr Ochsenhausen
 since 2010: Chartres ASTT

Achievements
 Singles bronze 2015 European Championships
 Team silver 2011 European Championships
 Doubles bronze 2010 European Championships (with Jens Lundqvist)
 Doubles winner 2005 Brazil Open (with Jens Lundqvist)

References

External links
 
 
 
 
 

1982 births
Living people
Olympic table tennis players of Sweden
Table tennis players at the 2008 Summer Olympics
Table tennis players at the 2012 Summer Olympics
Table tennis players at the 2016 Summer Olympics
Table tennis players at the 2015 European Games
European Games competitors for Sweden
People from Växjö
Sportspeople from Kronoberg County